Annbank is a village in South Ayrshire, Scotland. It is around five miles east of Ayr. Originally a mining settlement, it once had a rail link to Ayr via the Auchincruive Waggonway.

The village has a village hall, bakery, shop, bowling green, junior football club (Annbank United) and a pub.  The pub is known as "Tap o'the Brae" which in May 2014 won Ayrshire pub of the year.

Weston Bridge Halt railway station was located at the bridge of that name near Annbank and stood close to Ayr Colliery No.9. It was used by miners travelling to their respective collieries.

Annbank House once overlooked the River Ayr and Gadgirth Holm however it was demolished after use as a hotel.

Gadgirth Old Ha' stood on the River Ayr close to Privick Mill and the old Gadgirth House.

The Castle and Barony of Gadgirth was once located beside the River Ayr to the east of Annbank.

Notable people
James Brown, Member of Parliament 1918-1939
Sam Donnelly, professional footballer

References

External links
Video footage of the old Gadgirth Estate and Annbank House

Villages in South Ayrshire